Mats Bertil Hansson (born June 11, 1965) is a former Swedish sailor who competed in the 1988 Summer Olympics, where he finished 4th in the Star class together with Mats Johansson.

References

Swedish male sailors (sport)
Olympic sailors of Sweden
Sailors at the 1988 Summer Olympics – Star
1965 births
Living people
People from Kungsbacka
Sportspeople from Halland County